Love Is Poison is a Kannada-language drama film, directed by Nandan Prabhu in the year 2014. The cast of this movie includes Balley Rajesh and Shruthi Raj in lead role.

Summary 
The film is a story about today's youth that take impulsive decisions. In the film, the protagonist is a boy from a village, who comes to the city and falls in love with the heroine.

Cast 
 Rajesh
 Shruti Raj
 Sadhu Kokila
 Bullet Prakash
 Nagamagala Jayaram
 Doohi
 Chandru
 Biradar
 Honnavalli Krishna
 Poonam Pandey

Production 
The film was in the news for featuring an item number with Bollywood actress Poonam Pandey. The film also received media attention when actor Rajesh died during the shooting of this film.

Soundtrack
The music was composed by Sai Kiran and released under the label of Anand Audio video. The audio launch was held in tribute to Balle Rajesh.

References

External links 
 

2014 films
2010s Kannada-language films
Indian drama films